Brooksville Advent Church is a historic church at 1338 Dog Team Road in New Haven, Vermont.

It was built in 1837 and added to the National Register of Historic Places in 2002.  It was delisted in 2016.

References

Churches on the National Register of Historic Places in Vermont
Colonial Revival architecture in Vermont
Churches completed in 1910
20th-century churches in the United States
Buildings and structures in New Haven, Vermont
Churches in Addison County, Vermont
Former National Register of Historic Places in Vermont
National Register of Historic Places in Addison County, Vermont